The women's super-G took place on February 17, 2002.

Results
The results of the women's super-G event in alpine skiing at the 2002 Winter Olympics.

References

External links
Official Olympic Report
results

Super-G